The Fred Robinson Bridge in Montana is a four-span steel-girder bridge over the Missouri River between Fergus County and Phillips County that was listed on the National Register of Historic Places in 2012.  It is the "best documented" bridge in Montana and is "magnificent", according to its NRHP nomination.  Construction of the bridge was controversial;  it is named for Montana state senator Fred Robinson, "one of the bridge’s most aggressive and active proponents".

It was included in the "Montana's Steel Stringer and Steel Girder Bridges" Multiple Property Submission.

References

External links

Robinson Bridge pics

Road bridges on the National Register of Historic Places in Montana
Transportation in Phillips County, Montana
Transportation in Fergus County, Montana
National Register of Historic Places in Fergus County, Montana
National Register of Historic Places in Phillips County, Montana
Steel bridges in the United States
Girder bridges in the United States
1959 establishments in Montana
Bridges completed in 1959
Bridges over the Missouri River